E46 may refer to:
 BMW 3 Series (E46)
 European route E46
 Kamaishi Expressway and Akita Expressway (between Kitakami JCT and Kawabe JCT), route E46 in Japan